Kim Ji-young or Kim Ji-yeong is a Korean name and may refer to:

 Kim Ji-young (actress, born 1938) (1938–2017), South Korean actress
 Kim Ji-young (actress, born 1974), South Korean actress
 Kim Ji-yeong (voice actress) (born 1976), South Korean voice actress
 Ji-young Kim (born 1978), South Korean ballerina
 Kim Ji-young (actress, born 2005), South Korean actress
 , South Korean gymnast
 Chi-young Kim, Korean English literary translator